Bombay Dub Orchestra is the electronica/orchestral project of composers Garry Hughes and Andrew T. Mackay. Their self-titled debut album was released in 2006.

They have performed at various film festivals around the world including Indian Film Festival of Los Angeles and Stuttgart's Bollywood and Beyond.

Their third album, Tales From The Grand Bazaar (2013), was recorded in Kingston, Jamaica with Sly & Robbie, Istanbul, Turkey; Bombay, India; London & Rockfield Studios, UK, Los Angeles, and New York.

Discography
 Bombay Dub Orchestra, 2006
 Bombay Dub Orchestra Remixed Ep, 2006
 Monsoon Malabar EP, 2008
 3 Cities, 2008
 3 Cities in Dub, 2009
 The New York Remixes, 2012
 Tales From the Grand Bazaar, 2013 
 Bohemia Junction Remixes, 2014

References

External links
 Bombay Dub Orchestra

American electronic music groups
Six Degrees Records artists